Chakab (also Romanized as Chakāb and Chekāb) is a village in Fariman Rural District, in the Central District of Fariman County, Razavi Khorasan Province, Iran. At the 2006 census, its population was 24, in 5 families.

References 

Populated places in Fariman County